Wissahickon Skating Club (abbreviated to WSC) is a non-profit skating club in the Chestnut Hill section of Philadelphia. The club was organized in 1954 for the purpose of supporting amateur and professional athletes for ice hockey and figure skating competitions. Construction began in 1955, and in 1956, the doors opened. The original building, which was thoroughly renovated in 2019, still stands today.

Club history
WSC was started in 1954 by a group of Chestnut Hill residents who believed their community would benefit from a skating rink. With the contributions from many families, the rink was opened in 1956. Originally, the club only operated for seven months per year. However, by the late 1950s the club was operating year-round due to the availability of new rink cooling technology.

Ice hockey
The Wissahickon Skating Club's Youth Hockey Program is one of the longest-standing hockey programs in the greater Philadelphia area. In the early years, the club operated as an independent organization, competing against clubs similar in structure to WSC. Throughout the 1960s, 1970s, and 1980s, the club produced many of the area's elite players. Many of these players advanced to prominent boarding schools and NCAA Division 1 hockey programs. The program's most notable alumnus is two-time Olympian and New York Rangers Stanley Cup Champion goaltender, Mike Richter. Brian O'Neil (Yale University ECAC, Manchester Monarch's AHL) is another notable alum. In the early 1990s, WSC became a member of the Delaware Valley Hockey League and has since represented the DVHL and the Atlantic District at local and national championships. Typically, the club fields between 10 and 12 youth hockey teams (6–18) and four levels of senior hockey teams (19 and older). The Wissahickon Senior "A" team has been particularly strong in recent years, winning its very competitive league three years in a row and four of the last 6.

WSC vs. MAA
For the past 53 years, WSC and The Merritton Athletic Association located in St. Catharines, Ontario have operated a Peewee and Bantam level exchange tournament (alternating as hosts).  This is a truly remarkable event and one of the oldest American/Canadian hockey exchanges between two clubs in North America. The tournament is for the Peewee A and Bantam A levels. Each player is assigned a billet, to stay with during the tournament. The tournament location alternates yearly between Philadelphia and Merritton and is held during President's Day weekend or Family Day weekend in Ontario. There is a skills competition, exhibition game, and championship game at the Peewee and Bantam levels. In addition there is an alumni game held for past participants.

In 2017, mixed team competitions, a trade of players between teams, replaced the skills competition at the conclusion of the tournament.

Figure skating
WSC has a very strong figure skating program, thanks to the many veteran professional figure skaters that give daily instruction. Several members have competed and placed in the United States Figure Skating Association's (USFSA) South Atlantic, Eastern and National Competitions. WSC held the 1998 US National Figure Skating Championship. The club is also home to The Philadelphia Symmetry synchronized skating teams.

Wisscapades
Every two or three years the club presents an ice show called Wisscapades. The ice show, always tied to a theme, is designed to showcase WSC skaters and give the community an opportunity to see high-level skating talent. Each show has several guest stars and is a popular yearly attraction.

Pro shop
WSC has a pro shop with hockey/figure merchandise and club apparel.  Custom sharpening and repairs are also available in the pro shop.

Public sessions
WSC is open for public skating every Friday night from 8:30-10:30 as well as Saturday afternoons 12:45-2:15pm. There are also additional skating slots around the holidays. In addition to public sessions the ice can also be rented depending on availability. There is also space for birthday parties and private events.

Notable Hockey Players
 Mike Richter 
 Brian O'Neil
 Grace Dwyer

See also 
 Class of 1923 Arena
 Chestnut Hill, Philadelphia, Pennsylvania

References

External links 
 Wissahickon Skating Club Official website
  Chestnut Hill Local article

Figure skating clubs in the United States
Sports clubs established in 1956
Sports in Philadelphia
1956 establishments in Pennsylvania
Chestnut Hill, Philadelphia